Aksenovo is a rural locality (a village) in Pekshinskoye Rural Settlement, Petushinsky District, Vladimir Oblast, Russia. The population was 28 as of 2010. There are 2 streets.

Geography 
Aksenovo is located on the Bolshaya Lipnya River, 9 km east of Petushki (the district's administrative centre) by road. Novaya is the nearest rural locality.

References 

Rural localities in Petushinsky District